A Story of Water is a short film directed and written by Jean-Luc Godard and François Truffaut in 1958. It recounts the story of a woman's trip to Paris, which is surrounded by a large flooded area. It was first shown publicly in 1961. The title is a pun on the title of the erotic novel Une histoire d'O.  The film was shot in two days. The film is dedicated to Mack Sennett.

According to film critic David Edelstein, introducing the film's presentation on TCM.com, Truffaut's screenplay was a "slight but reasonably coherent romance" which was altered significantly in the editing room by Godard, who added absurdist voiceovers and percussion music while cutting out most of the plot.

The film is included as a supplement on Criterion's DVD/Blu-ray release of Truffaut's The Last Metro.

See also
 List of avant-garde films of the 1950s

References

External links
 \

1958 films
French black-and-white films
Films directed by François Truffaut
Films directed by Jean-Luc Godard
1950s French-language films
French short films
Films with screenplays by François Truffaut
1950s French films